John Staines is an association football player who represented New Zealand at international level.

Staines made his full All Whites debut in a 5–0 win over Fiji on 17 September 1968 and ended his international playing career with 13 A-international caps to his credit, his final cap an appearance in a 0–4 loss to Iraq on 24 March 1973.

References

External links

Year of birth missing (living people)
Living people
New Zealand association footballers
New Zealand international footballers
Association football midfielders
1973 Oceania Cup players